United Nations Security Council Resolution 1808 was passed unanimously by the United Nations Security Council on April 15, 2008. It sought to address the ongoing situation in Georgia, which had two breakaway de facto states within its borders, neither of which was recognised by the UN. The primary purpose was to extend the mandate of the United Nations Observer Mission in Georgia, which was mainly composed of Russian peacekeepers.

After the 2008 War in Georgia
Many states, especially Luxembourg, claimed that during the 2008 South Ossetia war, Russia was in violation of this resolution, especially after its recognition of Abkhazia and South Ossetia. Abkhazia is now recognised by six UN member states and South Ossetia by five, respectively.

References

External links
Text of the Resolution at undocs.org

 1808
South Ossetia
 1808
April 2008 events
2008 in Georgia (country)